Roy Masters may refer to:

 Roy Masters (commentator), British-born American talk radio personality
 Roy Masters (rugby league), Australian rugby league football coach and journalist